Ourno is a village and rural commune in Niger., Africa

References

Communes of Niger